The Foster Site is a historic archaeological site on the campus of the University of Virginia in Charlottesville, Virginia. The site was the location in the 19th century of a homestead purchased by a free African-American woman, Catherine "Kitty" Foster. The site includes archaeological and foundational remnants of her house, an outbuilding (likely a smokehouse), a brick-lined well, and a family cemetery.

The site was listed on the National Register of Historic Places in 2016.

See also
National Register of Historic Places listings in Charlottesville, Virginia

References

Archaeological sites on the National Register of Historic Places in Virginia
National Register of Historic Places in Charlottesville, Virginia
University of Virginia